Anna-Katharina Samsel (born 12 April 1985, in Hanover) is a German actress.

Samsel grew up in Wolfsburg where she completed her Abitur. In 1999 she became the German artistic roller skating champion and won the World Championships in 1999, 2000 and 2002.

Samsel appeared in the music video of Coldplay's 2008 single "Lost!". Since December 2009, she has played the role of Katja Bergmann in the RTL soap opera Alles was zählt.

Samsel now lives in Cologne,.
Her first appearance was in a short film Epicalypse Now by Daryush Shokof also in Cologne, Germany.

References

External links 
 Official website 
 

1985 births
Living people
Sportspeople from Hanover
German soap opera actresses
German roller skaters